The Glucksman, formerly known as the Lewis Glucksman Gallery, is an art museum in University College Cork, Ireland.

Opened to the public by the President of Ireland, Mary McAleese on 14 October 2004, the Glucksman was named 'Best Public Building in Ireland' by the Royal Institute of the Architects of Ireland in June 2005.  Designed by Irish practice O'Donnell + Tuomey architects and Arup Consulting Engineers, the architecture of the museum has been awarded several respected prizes, including a UK Civic Trust award, an RIBA award, as well as inclusion on the final shortlist for the 2005 Stirling Prize. In 2022, the Glucksman was the recipient of the European Museum Academy's Art Museum Award, focusing on the social role of museums.

University College Cork is substantially located on a single campus adjoining Cork city centre and the museum building occupies an accessible site close to the main entrance of the campus. The museum has three floors of display spaces and the temporary exhibitions programme focuses on thematic shows which have included Through the Looking Glass: Childhood in Contemporary Photography, Cooling Out: on the paradox of feminism and Overtake: the reinterpretation of modern art.

The museum is named for its benefactor, Wall Street financier and chairman of Lehman Brothers, Kuhn, Loeb Inc., Lewis Glucksman. The inaugural director, Fiona Kearney, is a fellow of the Clore Leadership Programme and an alumnus of the Salzburg Global Seminar.

References

External links
The Glucksman website

Art museums and galleries in the Republic of Ireland
University College Cork
Museums in County Cork
Tourist attractions in Cork (city)
University museums in the Republic of Ireland
Art galleries established in 2004
2004 establishments in Ireland
Buildings and structures in Cork (city)
Recipients of Civic Trust Awards
Contemporary art galleries in Ireland